Bridgewater is a town in Lunenburg County, Nova Scotia, Canada, at the navigable limit of the LaHave River. With a 2021 population of 8,790, Bridgewater is the largest town in the South Shore region.

Priding itself as "The Main Street of the South Shore," Bridgewater has long been established as the primary commercial and professional service centre in the southern half of the province. The community boasts a diverse local economy, as well as larger national and international employers.

History 
In 1604 French explorer Pierre Dugua, Sieur de Mons visited the area, and in the mid-1600s there was a small French settlement downriver of the current site at LaHave. The first bridge was built around 1825, and by 1850 the village had a population of 300. Lots were first surveyed in 1874.

Around this time industries were developed using water power from the river, including lumber manufacture, a carding mill, a foundry, a gristmill and a tannery.

From 1889 the town was connected by rail to Middleton, and eventually to the rest of the province and Canada via mergers with the Halifax and Southwestern Railway. Passenger service ended in 1976. The railway station, a local landmark, was burned in 1986 and is now the site of fast food outlets. Freight service ended in the early 1990s. 

In January 1899 a fire devastated the downtown core. One month later, the town was incorporated.

A lumber mill started by Edward Doran Davison on the site of the present-day South Shore Shopping Centre was in operation during the first two decades of the 1900s.

A major employer in the 1900s was the Acadia Gas Engines company, the largest marine inboard motor manufacturer in Canada. Their two-stroke engines, manufactured entirely in Bridgewater and nicknamed make and break engines, were exported worldwide. Employing over 100 at the King Street plant, the company declined and closed in the 1970s.

In 1971 Michelin opened a tire factory, eventually employing more than 1,000.

The western bank of the LaHave River was the area first settled, and continued to be the commercial and civic heart of the town well into the 20th century. However, since the 1970s, population and economic growth has been stronger on the eastern bank, with the development of shopping malls, new housing, and a regional hospital.

Geography 
Bridgewater spans the width of the LaHave River Valley and is dominated by hills that lead down to the river. Elevations range from 5 metres above sea level at the river, to nearly 110 m at the southwestern border. Like much of Southern Nova Scotia, the surrounding area is characterized by rolling drumlins formed during the last glacial period, some of which reach 150 metres above sea level. The LaHave River is traversed by two bridges in the centre of the town, as well as a 103 highway overpass and foot bridge towards the northern limits.

Climate

Like most of eastern Canada, Bridgewater experiences a humid continental climate (Dfb). The South Shore's proximity to the Atlantic Ocean does serve to moderate the climate, and the region is usually milder than most of Canada during the winter months. Nevertheless, winters are generally cold, damp, and snowy, along with frequent rain. Summers, while less extreme than inland central Canada, are warm to hot and sometimes humid, accented by occasional storms and showers. Autumn and spring are often wildly unpredictable, and snowfall in October and May is not unheard of.

Because it lies inland from the ocean, Bridgewater is usually warmer than coastal Nova Scotia during the summer, reporting far fewer foggy days.

Demographics 

In 2016, the average age was 46.8 years, over three years above the provincial average. 54% of the population was female, nearly 3% above the provincial average. 5.2% of residents declared themselves as immigrants, with most having arrived in Canada before 1981. Mother tongue was primarily English, with 1.4% reporting French, and 2.7% other. 7.8% were bilingual in French and English.

Economy 

Michelin is by far the town's largest employer. Other major sectors are a call centre, retail, and healthcare.

In 2015, the average household income was $46,836, almost $14,000 below the provincial average.

Arts and culture 
While Bridgewater is known more as a centre of commerce and industry, it does offer a number of cultural events. These include the annual Bridgewater Garden Party, Christmas on the LaHave, the Growing Green Sustainability Festival, and the Afterglow Art Festival. Founded in 1891, The South Shore Exhibition is the town's largest event, attracting some 50,000 people each July. Known locally as "The Big Ex," the week-long agricultural fair hosts the International Ox Pull, bringing together teams from the Maritimes and the Northeastern United States. The Exhibition also features a midway, carnival games, food, alcohol, animal exhibits, and musical acts.

Community music has been a fixture in the town for many years, including the Bridgewater Fire Department Band, active since 1868.  The South Shore Chorale, a seventy-voice mixed chorus, was founded in the 1960s, and for many years, the now-defunct Hospital Chorus and Drama Society helped to raise funds for the Dawson Memorial Hospital (later South Shore Regional Hospital) through its production of Broadway-style musicals.

Art Happening was established in 2014 to create a thriving community art space in Bridgewater. Inspired by the 'Art Hive' movement in Montreal, a group of community members developed a free/low cost art building focused on creativity for people of all ages and backgrounds. Today, Art Happening is a not-for-profit organization that strives on fun classes, stress relief, and creativity in all shapes and forms.

Like much of Lunenburg County, many of Bridgewater's residents trace their lineage to the Foreign Protestants who arrived in Nova Scotia in the 18th century. While much of that original culture has been lost, a few remnants remain. Lunenburg pudding, a type of pork sausage, is widely available, and some residents still speak in Lunenburg English, an accent featuring one of the few non-rhotic speech patterns remaining in Canada.

Sports, parks, and recreation

This, however, does not include open green space within the town, the inclusion of which would give a much higher total.

The crown jewel of the parks system continues to be the  Woodland Gardens, locally known at the "Duck Pond." This park includes the DesBrisay Museum, one of the town's public swimming pools, a large pond and various trails. Shipyards Landing is a large public park located at the reclaimed site of the former Acadia Gas Engine Company. Situated on south King Street along the LaHave River, the area features berthing for boaters and kayakers, picnic and open space, and is often used as a gathering point for festivals, such as Canada Day on the LaHave.

Other parks include Pinecrest and Glen Allen playgrounds, Riverview Park, King Street Court and Pijinuiskaq Park, located in the heart of the downtown. 8 kilometers of the Centennial Trail run through the town, constructed on abandoned rail lines.

Older recreational facilities include the Bridgewater Memorial Arena (opened in 1949 and closed in 2015), the Bridgewater Curling Club, the Kinsmen Field and the Bridgewater Tennis Club, and multiple softball, baseball, and soccer fields.

After a long period of stagnation, the 21st century has seen recreation facilities undergo a prolonged expansion.

In 2008, construction began on the HB Studios Sports Centre, a $1.7 million indoor turf, track, and amenities facility located on Glen Allan Drive.

In 2013, Bridgewater and Municipality of Lunenburg teamed up to construct the multi-purpose Lunenburg County Lifestyle Centre (LCLC) on North Park Street. This facility includes the Clearwater Seafoods Arena with a 1,200-person seating,  capacity, the Bank of Montreal Aquatic Centre, and the Margaret Hennigar Public Library. Around the same time, the Bridgewater Marina opened near the former Port of Bridgewater location on the east side of the LaHave River.

In July 2017, the town opened the South Shore Vet Dog Zone (an off-leash dog park) at Generations Active Park near HB Studios Sports Centre.

In the summer of 2018, after years of planning and design work, the Bridgewater Skate Park opened on York Street in Bridgewater, backed by funding contributions from the Town of Bridgewater, Municipality of the District of Lunenburg, and the Province of Nova Scotia.

Government

Policing 
The Bridgewater Police Service has moved towards a community based policing model, working closely with Neighbourhood Watch programmes and local schools, as well as adding foot and bicycle patrols in areas that squad cars are unable to reach.

The Bridgewater Police Service is governed by the Bridgewater Police Commission. This is made up of both political and citizen appointees. The current chair of the Board of Police Commissioners is Citizen Representative and former mayor, H. David Walker.

Planning 
In 2013, Bridgewater Town Council released the Downtown and Waterfront Master Plan (DWMP) to guide the development of Downtown Bridgewater over the next few decades. In 2019, the Town of Bridgewater's Planning Department absorbed the Parks, Recreation, and Culture arm of the town's operations and was rebranded as the Department of Community Development.

Education and health 
The town is primarily served by Bridgewater Elementary and Junior High School, both located on York Street. Located at the northern edge of town, Park View Education Centre serves grades 10-12 and takes part in the International Baccalaureate program. Along with serving Bridgewater, it also acts as a collector school for students from the rural areas of the county. Centre Scolaire de la Rive-Sud in Cookville offers a primarily French-language education to Francophone families in the area as part of Nova Scotia's Acadian school system. The Lunenburg campus of the Nova Scotia Community College is located on High Street, sharing space with the YMCA.

The town has two provincial museums, The DesBrisay and the Wile Carding Mill, as well as a central library.

According to the 2016 census, of the town's population ages 25–64, 15.0% had not received a high school diploma while 61.7% had received at least some sort of post secondary degree or certificate. Both figures were slightly worse than the average for Nova Scotia (12.2% and 64.2%, respectively), but significantly better than Lunenburg County (16% and 60.3%) and neighbouring Queens County (20.2% and 51.8%).

Bridgewater is served by the South Shore Regional Hospital, located on Glen Allen Drive. Inaugurated in 1988, the facility replaced the 1960s-era Dawson Memorial Hospital located on the south western side of the town. The SSRH serves as the major hospital in the county and offers most standard services.

Media 
Bridgewater is served by CKBW-FM radio, CJHK-FM, the South Shore Breaker, and LighthouseNOW. Established in 1947, CKBW-FM has shifted its music focus several times over the past two decades, and now airs mostly contemporary pop music. CJHK-FM began operating in 2010 as a sister-station to CKBW, and airs country music. The South Shore Breaker is owned by SaltWire Network and produces a weekly newspaper. The weekly LighthouseNow Progress Bulletin (formerly Bridgewater Bulletin) has been in publication since 1888 and has won numerous awards for its content and lay-out. LighthouseNOW also distributes the Lighthouse Log, a free weekend paper.

Transportation

Since 2008, Bridgewater has supported Active Transportation, which guides policy and infrastructure. The goal is to promote human-powered means of transport as a safe part of everyday life.

Provincial Highway 103 links Bridgewater with Halifax and Yarmouth via two exits, with another under construction. Trunk highways 10 and 3 meet at Bridgewater, and other provincial routes include 325 and 331.

As the town continues to grow, traffic flow and congestion is of great concern. As Lunenburg County's biggest center of employment and commerce, Bridgewater also sees a large influx of daytime traffic. The town's geography and two bridge crossings within town limits can amplify traffic disruption when construction work forces the closure of one of the main routes.

A public transit pilot operation began in 2017, and was made permanent in 2019 due to use exceeding expectations. The town's bus route runs through residential areas and popular destinations once per hour, six days per week. Feasibility studies into public transit between Bridgewater, Lunenburg and Mahone Bay have occurred but have not yet resulted in service.

There is no freight or passenger rail service.

Historically, the LaHave River was a primary transportation route, although today it is mainly used for recreational boating. The LaHave cable ferry is the only crossing downriver from Bridgewater.

Notable residents 

Allan Blakeney, 10th Premier of Saskatchewan, born in Bridgewater
Stella Bowles , environmental scientist and youngest recipient of the Order of Nova Scotia, appointed 2020
Robert MacGregor Dawson - political scientist
John Dunsworth - actor & politician
Sheila A. Hellstrom - first woman to graduate from Canadian Forces College, and the first woman Regular Force member to achieve the rank of Brigadier-General
Jenna Martin - Canadian Olympian
Glen Murray - former NHL hockey player
Donald Sutherland - actor

See also
 List of municipalities in Nova Scotia

References

External links 

 Town of Bridgewater

1812 establishments in the British Empire
 
Towns in Nova Scotia